La Saunière is a commune in the Creuse department in the Nouvelle-Aquitaine region in central France.

Geography

Population

Sights
 The church, dating from the twelfth century.
 The fifteenth-century château du Théret.

Personalities
 René Boudard (1909–2004), historian, was born here.

See also
Communes of the Creuse department

References

Communes of Creuse